The Exit-Entry Permit for Travelling to and from Hong Kong and Macau, colloquially known as a Two-way Permit or EEP (Exit-Entry Permit) is issued to Chinese nationals with residency in Mainland China as a travel document for the sole purpose to travel the Chinese Special Administrative Regions of Hong Kong and Macau. The Bureau of Exit and Entry Administration of the Chinese Ministry of Public Security is responsible for the issuing of Two-way Permits and exit endorsements.

Due to the "One country, two systems" policy, Hong Kong, Macau and Mainland Chinese residents who are Chinese citizens cannot use their Chinese, Hong Kong, or Macau passports to enter their respective territories normally, even though those passports are considered legally valid travel documents. The Two-way Permit is the sole travel document for personal visit, family reunion, business, and other non-government purposes to and from the two Chinese Special Administrative Regions. Exceptions are Mainland residents who are transiting to or from a third country or region, as they can use their Chinese passports when entering Hong Kong or Macau for a stay of seven days.

Physical appearance
The new version of the permit is changed to a credit-card sized document, which also contains a biometric chip, and was first introduced in Guangdong on May 20, 2014, and later issued nationally on September 15, 2014. The design is similar to the Taiwan Compatriot Permit but the card's color scheme is in light blue. The personal data are directly imprinted on the front of the card while the back of the card contains heat-sensitive ink which are used to print entry endorsements.

Previous version of the permit is a passport-like booklet format, with a blue cover and the National Emblem of the People's Republic of China in gold. The words "中华人民共和国" (People's Republic of China) and "往来港澳通行证" (Exit-Entry Permit for Travelling to and from Hong Kong and Macau) are displayed in simplified Chinese characters. The booklet-type permit has 32 pages for entry endorsements, and the biodata page, with the machine-readable code, is located in the back cover, unlike Chinese passports. All personal data are printed solely in Simplified Chinese, with only the name of the holder transcribed into Pinyin.

Issuing process
Two-way Permits are issued, just like the Chinese passport, by local Exit and Entry Administrations (EEA) of local Public Security Bureaus (PSB) of their places of residence. Mainland residents must apply for a new permit in person, while exit endorsements can be obtained either through the automatic endorsement machine located in EEA offices or by mail for persons residing in Guangdong. Exit endorsements are not issued to a permit with a remaining validity of less than three months.

Types of exit endorsement for Two-way Permit
In general, a Mainland resident who is in possession of a valid EEP bearing a valid exit endorsement may exit Mainland China and land in Hong Kong, with a limit of stay in accordance with the exit endorsement, provided that normal immigration requirements are met. The number of journeys permitted to Hong Kong are stated in the exit endorsement, i.e. single-journey, double-journey or multiple-journey; and every endorsement has a "valid for/until" date, which refers to the expiry of endorsement and shall not be confused with the length of stay. There are six types of exit endorsements issued by Ministry of Public Security:

 G (individual visits): valid for 3 month or 1 year, single- or double- journey, maximum 7 days per visit; Shenzhen residents can have a special 1 year multiple-journey endorsement (but maximum 1 visit per week starting from April 13, 2015). This type of exit endorsement is only issued to people who have  in certain regions. Since January 28, 2020, issuing of G endorsement is suspended due to COVID-19 pandemic.The issuing of G endorsements is resumed since January 8, 2023.
 T (family reunion): to visit a sibling: valid for 3 months, single journey, maximum 14 days; to visit a parent/parent-in-law or child: ibid, or valid for 3 months, multi-entry, maximum stay 90 days. 
 S (business purpose): valid for 3 months or one year, maximum 7 days per visit. Since February 7, 2020, issuing of S endorsement is suspended due to COVID-19 pandemic.The issuing of S endorsements is resumed since January 8, 2023.
 L (tour group): valid for 3 month or 1 year, single- or double- journey, maximum 7 days per visit. Since January 28, 2020, issuing of L endorsement is suspended due to COVID-19 pandemic.The issuing of L endorsements is resumed since January 8, 2023.
 D (multiple exits and entries): maximum stay authorized by respective SAR immigration officers.
 Q (other purposes of visit): valid for 3 month or 1 year, single- or double- journey, maximum 14 days per visit.

In addition,  A was a specially-designated endorsement for 90-day multi-entry during the 2008 Summer Olympics in Beijing.

Women who are more than 28 weeks pregnant and suspected to be entering Hong Kong to give birth must show a booking confirmation at a Hong Kong hospital.

Exit endorsements issued to the booklet-type permit are affixed on one of the endorsement pages, similar to visas, while card-type permits have the information stored in the chip. The heat-sensitive ink in the back of the card ensures that the exit endorsements are visible to human eyes and can be re-printed by the special printer after the endorsement is used or invalid.

See also
One-way Permit
Home Return Permit
Taiwan Compatriot Entry Permit
Individual Visit Scheme

References

External links

内地居民申请往来港澳地区 
Division of Exit & Entry Administration, Guangdong provincial Public Security Department 
Two-way Permit application guide, China Travel Service Hong Kong

International travel documents
Identity documents